The Facelinidae are a taxonomic family of colorful sea slugs. These are specifically aeolid nudibranchs. They are marine gastropod molluscs.

Taxonomy

2005 taxonomy 
This family consists of the following subfamilies (according to the taxonomy of the Gastropoda by Bouchet & Rocroi, 2005):
 Facelininae Bergh, 1889 - synonyms: Caloriidae Odhner, 1968; Phidianidae Odhner, 1968; Pruvotfoliinae Tardy, 1970
 Babakininae Roller, 1973 - synonym: Babainidae Roller, 1972 (inv.)
 Crateninae Bergh, 1889 - synonym: Rizzoliinae Odhner, 1939 (inv.)
 Favorininae Bergh, 1889 - synonyms: Myrrhinidae Bergh, 1905; Phyllodesmiinae Thiele, 1931;   Facalaninae Er. Marcus, 1958
 Herviellinae Burn, 1967
 Pteraeolidiinae Risbec, 1953

2007 taxonomy 
Gosliner et al. (2007) have elevated subfamily Babakininae to family level Babakinidae.

Genera 
Genera and species within the family Facelinidae include:

Subfamily Facelininae
 Facelina Alder & Hancock, 1855 - type genus of the family Facelinidae
 Caloria Trinchese, 1888
 Facelinopsis Pruvot-Fol, 1954
 Facelinopsis marioni (Vayssière, 1888)
 Facelinopsis pacodelucia Ortea, Moro & Caballer, 2014
 Moridilla Bergh, 1888 (nomen dubium)
 Moridilla brockii (nomen dubium)
 Pruvotfolia Tardy, 1969
 Pruvotfolia longicirrha (Eliot, 1906)
 Pruvotfolia pselliotes (Labbé, 1923)
 Pruvotfolia rochebruni Ortea, Moro & Caballer, 2002
Subfamily Crateninae
 Amanda Macnae, 1954
 Cratena Bergh, 1864 - type genus of the subfamily Crateninae
Subfamily Favorininae
 Dicata Schmekel, 1967
 Favorinus M.E. Gray, 1850 - type genus of the subfamily Favorininae
 Sakuraeolis Baba, 1965
Subfamily Herviellinae
 Herviella  Baba, 1949 - type genus of the subfamily Herviellinae
Subfamily Pteraeolidiinae
 Pteraeolidia Bergh, 1875 - type genus of the subfamily Pteraeolidiinae
Subfamily Incertae sedis
 Adfacelina Millen & Hermosillo, 2012 
 Adfacelina medinai Millen & Hermosillo, 2012
 Algarvia Garcia-Gomez & Cervera, 1989
 Algarvia alba Garcia-Gomez & Cervera, 1989
 Anetarca Gosliner, 1991
Anetarca armata Gosliner, 1991
Anetarca brasiliana García & Troncoso, 2004
 Anetarca piutaensis (Ortea, Caballer & Espinosa, 2003)
 Antonietta Schmekel, 1966
 Austraeolis Burn, 1962
 Bajaeolis Gosliner & Behrens, 1986
 Bajaeolis bertschi Gosliner & Behrens, 1986
 Echinopsole Macnae, 1954
 Echinopsole breviceratae Burn, 1962
 Echinopsole fulvus Macnae, 1954
 Emarcusia Roller, 1972
 Emarcusia morroensis Roller, 1972
 Hermosita Gosliner & Behrens, 1986
 Hermosita hakunamatata (Ortea, Caballer & Espinosa, 2003)
 Hermosita sangria Gosliner & Behrens, 1986
 Jason Miller, 1974
 Learchis Bergh, 1896
 Nanuca  Er. Marcus, 1957
 Nanuca sebastiani Er. Marcus, 1957
 Noumeaella Risbec, 1937
 Palisa Edmunds, 1964
 Palisa papillata Edmunds, 1964
 Pauleo Millen & Hamann, 1992
 Pauleo jubatus Millen & Hamann, 1992
 Phidiana Gray, 1850
 Setoeolis Baba & Hamatani 1965
 Setoeolis inconspicua (Baba, 1938)

Subfamilies and genera brought into synonymy:
 Acanthopsole Trinchese, 1874: synonym of Facelina Alder & Hancock, 1855
 Ennoia Bergh, 1896: synonym of Phyllodesmium Ehrenberg, 1831
 Subfamily Facalaninae: synonym of Favorininae
 Facelinella Pruvot-Fol, 1951: synonym of Facelinopsis Pruvot-Fol, 1954
 Facelinella Baba, 1949: synonym of Facelina Alder & Hancock, 1855
 Matharena Bergh in Mörch, 1871: synonym of Favorinus M. E. Gray, 1850
 Morildilla [sic] : synonym of Moridilla Bergh, 1888
 Muessa Er. Marcus, 1965: synonym of Facelina Alder & Hancock, 1855
 Subfamily Pruvotfoliinae: synonym of Facelininae
 Rizzolia Trinchese, 1877: synonym of Cratena Bergh, 1864
 Rolandia Pruvot-Fol, 1951 invalid: junior homonym of Rolandia Lacaze-Duthiers, 1900: synonym of Pruvotfolia Tardy, 1969
 Subfamily Rizzoliinae: synonym of Crateninae

References

 Vaught, K.C. (1989). A classification of the living Mollusca. American Malacologists: Melbourne, FL (USA). . XII, 195 pp.
 http://www.catalogueoflife.org accessed 18 November 2009
 http://www.seaslugforum.net accessed 18 November 2009

 
Gastropod families